Ain't Gonna Worry is an album by the American country music singer Crystal Gayle. Released on July 2, 1990, it marked the end of her run of Billboard album chart appearances (though a Greatest Hits album would make the Top 100 Country Albums chart in 2007). The album was Gayle's first and only album for the Capitol Records label.

Though the album itself failed to chart, one of its tracks, "Never Ending Song of Love", reached number 72 on the Country Singles chart. It also included covers of "Once in a Very Blue Moon" (although writers Pat Alger and Eugene Levine had Gayle in mind when first penning the song) and "Faithless Love", songs previously associated with Nanci Griffith and Linda Ronstadt respectively. "What He's Doing Now" would later be a hit for its co-writer, Garth Brooks (as "What She's Doing Now").

Track listing

Personnel
Crystal Gayle - vocals; Druid bell on "Faithless Love"
Chris Leuzinger - acoustic and electric guitar
Johnny Christopher - rhythm guitar
Mark Casstevens - acoustic guitar
Bob Wray - bass
Stuart Duncan - mandolin
Bobby Wood - piano, keyboards
Charles Cochran - piano, string arrangements
Pete Wasner - piano
Joey Miskulin - accordion
Milton Sledge - drums, percussion
Kenny Malone - congas
Kirk "Jelly Roll" Johnson - harmonica
The Nashville String Machine - strings
Duncan Mullins, Peggy Sue Wright, Craig Bickhardt, Donna McElroy, Hurshel Wiginton, Kathy Chiavola, Wayland Patton, Cindy Richardson-Walker,  Allen Reynolds, Beth Nielsen Chapman, Bobby Wood, Crystal Gayle, David Kumin, David Mallett, Garth Brooks, Hal Ketchum, Jamie O'Hara, Jim Rooney, Johnny Rodriguez, Jon Vezner, Jonathan Pierce Hildreth, Julie Gold, Kathy Mattea, Kieran Kane, Pat Alger, Pete Wasner, Randy VanWarmer, Richard Leigh - harmony vocals

References

Crystal Gayle albums
1990 albums
Albums produced by Allen Reynolds
Capitol Records albums